David Eric Doster (born October 8, 1970), is an American former professional baseball second baseman, who played Major League Baseball (MLB) with the Philadelphia Phillies, during the  and  seasons.

Doster played baseball scholastically at New Haven High School and Indiana State University. He was drafted by the Phillies in the 27th round of the 1993 amateur draft.

Doster had very good MiLB career: He won a Double-A title with the  Reading Phillies, was a  International League All-Star, and ranks 2nd on the Pacific Coast League's 'Consecutive Game Hit Streak List', with 32 games (trailing only Joe DiMaggio).

Doster is still currently involved in baseball. He is teaching lessons at Strike Zone Training Center in Fort Wayne. Doster is also a color commentary broadcaster for the Fort Wayne TinCaps.

References

External links

1970 births
Living people
American expatriate baseball players in Japan
American expatriate baseball players in Mexico
Baseball players from Fort Wayne, Indiana
Clearwater Phillies players
Fresno Grizzlies players
Indiana State Sycamores baseball players
Major League Baseball second basemen
Mexican League baseball left fielders
Mexican League baseball right fielders
Mexican League baseball shortstops
Mexican League baseball third basemen
Nashville Sounds players
Nippon Professional Baseball second basemen
Philadelphia Phillies players
Reading Phillies players
Scranton/Wilkes-Barre Red Barons players
Spartanburg Phillies players
Tucson Sidewinders players
Tuneros de San Luis Potosí players
Yokohama BayStars players